Feza may refer to:

Consolate Feza (born 1985), Congolese handball player
Farida Feza (born 1999), DR Congolese footballer
Mongezi Feza (1945–1975), South African jazz trumpeter and flautist
Qamil Musa Haxhi Feza, Albanian statesman
Feza Gürsey (1921–1992), Turkish mathematician and physicist
Shehret Feza Hanim (died 1895), the ethnic Circassian Princess consort of Khedive Isma'il Pasha of Egypt

See also
Feza Gürsey Science Center, a science museum in Ankara, Turkey
Feza Gürsey Institute, a joint institute of Boğaziçi University and TÜBİTAK
Feza Publications, a Turkish media conglomerate established in 1986
Faiza